Round 1 is the first extended play by South Korean girl group C-REAL. It was released on October 12, 2011. They started promoting their debut song No No No No No from the album on the same day.

Background
The EP was produced by various top musicians in the music industry such as Choi Kap Won, Brave Brothers, Kim Do Hoon, Wheesung, PJ and Shinsadong Tiger. Their debut single from the EP No No No No No was done by hit making producer, Brave Brothers. According to representative Choi Kap Won, the album has a track that have emotions and feel that fits best girls that age.

Track listing

References

2011 EPs
Korean-language EPs
Kakao M EPs